The 2000 United States Senate election in New Mexico took place on November 7, 2000. Incumbent Democrat U.S. Senator Jeff Bingaman won re-election to a fourth term.

Democratic primary

Candidates 
 Jeff Bingaman, incumbent U.S. Senator

Results

Republican primary

Candidates 
 Bill Redmond, former U.S. Representative
 Steve Pearce, State Representative
 William Davis, former State Senator

Results

General election

Candidates 
 Jeff Bingaman (D), incumbent U.S. Senator
 Bill Redmond (R), former U.S. Representative

Results

See also 
 2000 United States Senate elections

References 

New Mexico
2000
2000 New Mexico elections